Alberts Zvejnieks (28 December 1902 – 30 November 1987) was a Latvian wrestler. He competed at the 1928 Summer Olympics and the 1936 Summer Olympics.

References

1902 births
1987 deaths
Latvian male sport wrestlers
Olympic wrestlers of Latvia
Wrestlers at the 1928 Summer Olympics
Wrestlers at the 1936 Summer Olympics
Sportspeople from Daugavpils